Lake Hubert is an unincorporated community in Lake Edward Township, Crow Wing County, Minnesota, United States. It is along Crow Wing County Road 13 near County Road 137. Lake Hubert has the ZIP code 56459.

History
A post office called Lake Hubert was established in 1929, and remained in operation until it was discontinued in 1998. The community took its name from nearby Lake Hubert.

References

Unincorporated communities in Crow Wing County, Minnesota
Unincorporated communities in Minnesota